Jackie is a 2010 Indian Kannada-language action film directed by Soori and stars Puneeth Rajkumar and Bhavana. It was released in Kannada on 14 October 2010 to a critical acclaim and was adjudged the Best Film of 2010 at the South Filmfare Awards. The Telugu dubbed version was released on 6 May 2011

The film is noted for its technical prowess, witty dialogues and lyrics, combined with an art that has become a trademark of Soori's rustic feel cinema. It is also considered one of the trend-setter films of the Kannada film industry. One of the landmark movies in Puneeth Rajkumar's career, the movie was especially noted for its music by V. Harikrishna. Yograj Bhat was the lyricist for all the songs of the movie. The album, which celebrated its platinum disc, is also available as a 5.1 audio DVD disc. After successful screening in Australia, United Kingdom and Germany, Jackie was released in the US and Singapore in February 2011.

A portion of the song Kannalle Eno from Rajkumar's 1980 movie Vasantha Geetha was re-used in the title track of this movie.

Plot
Janakirama aka Jackie  is an 8th standard school dropout, who is living with his mother Jayamma and operates a flour mill in a village with his mother. Jackie dreams of making it big; but not by hard work and also is an expert card player and thinks he can repay all his debts with earnings from it. He does every job and hopes that he would one day make it big as a real estate dealer. He is talkative and uses the opportunities around him to eke out a living. In the locality where he lives, his friend Yashodha, who is a priest's daughter reveals that she is in love with a photo studio owner Parangi Seena  who is actually a conduit for a human trafficker and asks Jackie to help her get married. 

Jackie initially tries to help, but when the priest questions him regarding his responsibilities of a brother. He decides to cop out of the issue, respecting the aged father's feelings. Losing all hope, Yashodha elopes with Seena, along with a blind girl Puttavva. The priest is under the impression that Jackie is the mediator in this case. So Jackie takes responsibility to trace Yashodha and bring her back. Meanwhile, Jackie is followed by a CBI officer and his team as he has sheltered a friend Tulasi, who has escaped from prison, and a constable is killed in an accident during the escapade. The CBI officer tracks them down and kills Thulasi, but Jackie escapes from the police and reaches a dense forest. He also averts a ritual of human sacrifice where Lakshmi is the intended victim. 

The trouble shoots up for Jackie again as even the CBI officer and his team are chasing him now. As he lands up in Bengaluru, he finds out that Puttavva who went with Yashodha is dead. He gets a clue of Prasanna aka Jooli, when he becomes friendly to constable Bheemanna which leads to suspicious activities of a gang transporting girls to abroad in oil tankers, headed by Mithai Rama. Jackie is on the hunt for the dangerous team, and as the CBI officer catches him, where he explains the situation by tracking them with the help of Lakshmi. Not trusting the CID officers, Jackie escapes and saves Mithai Rama, where they reach the hideout, Mittai Rama, having guessed that Jackie is with the CID confronts him where he divulges the truth and is taken to see Yashoda, where a fight erupts and Jackie is knocked out and is partially buried with Yashoda and leave with the girls in oil tankers. 

However, Jackie awakes from the site along with Yashoda. He tracks down Mithai Rama and Seena where he thrashes them and saves the girls. The CBI officer arrives with his team and realize the situation where he congratulates him for solving the case and kills Seena and Mithai Rama in an encounter. Jackie tells Yashoda to phone her father and Lakshmi, who has fallen for Jackie proposes him in a comical fashion by having him held point-blank. Jackie takes his mother to see Yashoda and also introduces Lakshmi.

Cast

Director: Soori, Lyricist: Yograj Bhat and music director: V. Harikrishna appeared on-screen in the introduction track of the Jackie.

Production
The production of the film started on 3 March at Kantheerava Studio and took place for 95 days in Bengaluru, Mysore, Italy and Namibia. The film is made in the home production of Rajkumar's family under the banner of Poornima Enterprises. Jackie is Puneet's 15th film and his first with Duniya Soori. The film saw the debut of Malayalam actress Bhavana in Kannada language films.

Director Soori, who is known for maintaining his script and characters a secret, had earlier revealed that the film is about how life takes a turn for Jackie and the way he faces the challenges and added that the film would be different from Puneet's earlier films. Soori, however, was initially "scared" to be directing a Puneeth Rajkumar flick just because of the enormous expectations from the audience. SnorriCam has been used extensively in the film's song and stunt sequences, giving it a point-of-view feel. The director - actor went on to work in Anna Bond and Doddmane Hudga.

Remake rights were purchased by NS Rajkumar, who is dubbing the Kannada film to Telugu and Malayalam languages for a 2011 release.

Release

Kannada
Jackie, received an opening unprecedented in Kannada film industry after it was purchased by distributors at astronomical prices many days before the film's release. Jackie was released  on 14 October 2010 in over 125 theaters  all over Karnataka apart from 4 in Tamil Nadu and a 3 multiplex in Hyderabad. The film, which was initially slated for a late September release, was later postponed to October owing to pending work on digital grading.

International releases
Jackie was released overseas by Bevin Exports in the countries of Australia, UK, Singapore, Germany, US, Dubai and New Zealand among others. The same firm had earlier released other Kannada blockbusters like Mungaaru Male and Aramane worldwide. The global distribution will be on a 50:50 sharing between Poornima Enterprises and Bevin Exports.

It was screened in Melbourne, Adelaide and Perth on 7 November, where it was well received by the audience, which also consisted of non-Kannadigas. A similar reception was reported in Germany, where the screening took place in mid-December. In the UK, it was screened in the months of November and December in association with Gandhadagudi Movies Team. The film was part of the Indian Melbourne Film Festival on 29 Dec. In United States, Jackie was released in a phase-wise manner from the 2nd week of Jan 2011. In its first phase, screening was held in San Francisco and Bay Area. In the next phase, the film was screened in Los Angeles, New Jersey, Dallas and Houston. In Singapore, it was screened on 6 March 2011.

Telugu
The Dubbed Telugu version of Jackie is produced by Nadella Sujatha through Suraj Films studio and was released in the state of Andhra Pradesh on 6 May 2011.

Reception

Critical response 

Shruti Indira Lakshminarayana of Rediff.com scored the film at 2.5 out of 5 stars and says "Puneet puts up a convincing performance. The songs and fights have been designed to suit the actor's image to perfection. Bhavana looks good in songs to which she is mostly confined. Harshika Poonacha, Birardar, Ravi Kale and Sampath Kumar have small roles. Jackie caters both to the class and the mass. It has a fair share of both sentiments and action and even comes with a message on human trafficking. Makes for a one time watch". A critic from The New Indian Express wrote "Puneet delivers a superb performance. The effortless ease with which he gets into the skin of the character is commendable. Rangayana Raghu as a cop is also brilliant. The songs, written by Yogaraj Bhat and composed by Hari Krishna, stay with you even after coming out of the theatre. 'Jackie' is an enjoyable fast paced entertainer. Go for it". A critic from The Times of India scored the film at 4 out of 5 stars and says "However, it's Puneet who shines through the film with his bindaas performance. Rangayana Raghu adds to the film's brilliance. The film has also been well edited by Dipu S Kumar. Sathya Hegde's cinematography is well executed, while music director V Harikrishna has rendered some excellent numbers to lyrics of Yograj Bhat. Choreography by Imran Sardaria and Harsha are some positives to the film. In all, it's a movie for the mass, class and family".

Awards

 Best Film of 2010 – Suvarna Awards 2011
 Best Actor - Puneeth Rajkumar  – Suvarna Awards 2011

Soundtrack

Kannada soundtrack

Jackie Kannada soundtrack was released in the month of August 2010. In a first of its kind, audio was simultaneously released over Bluetooth by a Bengaluru-based company called TELiBrahma. TELiBrahma developed an exclusive mobile application for the film and distributed it across about 100 of its proprietary technology called BluFi locations in Bengaluru. Considered a success, this campaign resulted in nearly 55,000 downloads in 16 days.

Overall, the commercial reception of the album was successful, with 20,000 audio CDs being sold on the first day. The music album was released again on a 5.1 Audio DVD during platinum disc celebration on 27 December 2010.

The music was composed by V. Harikrishna and lyrics were penned by Yogaraj Bhat.

A portion of the song Kannalle Eno from Rajkumar's 1980 movie Vasantha Geetha was re-used in the title track of this movie.

Leaked Song
The soundtrack of the film created quite a stir before the audio release when the song "Ekka Raja Rani" was leaked on YouTube. This song, though unfinished, became quite popular with listeners.

Telugu soundtrack

Telugu version audio release was held on 26 February 2011 at Hotel Daspalla in Hyderabad with Telugu film personalities Akkineni Nageswara Rao and Allu Arjun as chief guests. Bhuvana Chandra, Vennelakanti and Vanamali have composed the Telugu lyrics.

References

External links
 
 

2010 films
2010 action thriller films
2010 action drama films
Films scored by V. Harikrishna
Films shot in Namibia
Films set in Bangalore
Indian romantic action films
2010 masala films
Films about human trafficking in India
2010s Kannada-language films
Films directed by Duniya Soori